Sonya Salomaa (born 1974) is a Canadian actress, known for her performances in The Collector and Durham County.

Early life
She was born in Sudbury, Ontario. Salomaa grew up in Prince George, British Columbia and attended the University of Northern British Columbia to pursue a Bachelor of Science in Forestry. In her last summer break, she went to Victoria to sing and play the guitar. While in Victoria she became interested in acting.

Career
Salomaa, a Finnish Canadian, first appeared on screen in 2000. In 2005 she took over the role of Maya Kandinski from Carly Pope in the Canadian supernatural drama series, The Collector. She won Leo Awards two years running for Best Actress in a Supporting Role. This was followed by a season in Durham County (2007) and received a Leo nomination for her role as Traci Prager. In 2008, Salomaa again took over a role—this time from Claudette Mink—of the character Laura Nelson, a member of the coast guard in The Guard. She has also guest starred in several TV shows including Supernatural, Covert Affairs and Flashpoint. She was one of the presenters for the 2010 Leo Awards.

She has also performed in numerous films including the 2006 comedy, The Tooth Fairy, Shannen Doherty's Christmas Caper (2007) and 2009's Malibu Shark Attack. Salomaa starred as a wannabe singer coming to terms with not following her dreams in the 2006 Canadian drama Black Eyed Dog and was the antagonist of Ties That Bind opposite Brian Krause and Nicole De Boer.

Personal life
She now lives in Vancouver and is married to Warren Christie.

Filmography

Awards and nominations

References

External links
 Sonya Salomaa at Northernstars.ca
 
 Review of Black Eyed Dog
 Sonya Salomaa Biography at The Promotion People

Living people
21st-century Canadian actresses
Actresses from British Columbia
Actresses from Greater Sudbury
Canadian film actresses
Canadian people of Finnish descent
Canadian television actresses
People from Prince George, British Columbia
University of Northern British Columbia alumni
1974 births